Fratelli d'Italia is a 1989 Italian comedy film directed by Neri Parenti.

Plot summary
Three episodes held together by a common element: a car rented by three different characters. A salesman ends up the case to pass a great weekend on a VIP boat. An employee saw go up in smoke the long-awaited night of passion with the wife of the chief. A Milan fan forced by circumstances to pretend frantic Roma player.

Cast
Massimo Boldi as Rag. Carlo Verdone
Jerry Calà as Roberto Marcolin
Christian De Sica as Cesare
Sabrina Salerno as Michela Sauli
Gian Fabio Bosco as Commendator Sauli
Maurizio Mattioli as Remo
Nathalie Caldonazzo as Turchese De Benedetti
Angelo Bernabucci as Romolo
Fabrizio Bracconeri as Sergio
Gloria Paul 
Ida Galli 
Massimo Serato

References

External links

1989 films
1989 comedy films
1980s Italian-language films
Films directed by Neri Parenti
Italian comedy films
1980s Italian films